The 1927 Baylor Bears football team represented Baylor University in the Southwest Conference (SWC) during the 1927 college football season. In their second season under head coach Morley Jennings, the Bears compiled a 2–7 record (0–5 against conference opponents), finished in last place in the conference, and were outscored by opponents by a combined total of 139 to 74. They played their home games at Cotton Palace in Waco, Texas. Wesley F. Weed was the team captain.

Schedule

References

Baylor
Baylor Bears football seasons
Baylor Bears football